Elmo Garnett Cross Jr. (born February 19, 1942) is an American lawyer and politician who served for 20 years as a member of the Senate of Virginia. He was defeated for reelection in 1995 by Bill Bolling. At the time, Cross was chair of the Senate's agriculture committee.

References

External links 
 

1942 births
Living people
Democratic Party Virginia state senators
20th-century American politicians